This is a list of Norwegian artists that released black metal music during 1987–1993. The scene of which they were part is credited with creating the modern black metal genre and produced some of the most acclaimed and influential artists in extreme metal. It attracted massive media attention when it was revealed that its members had been responsible for two murders and a wave of church burnings in Norway.

The scene had an ethos and the core members referred to themselves as "The Black Circle" or "Black Metal Inner Circle". It consisted primarily of young men, many of whom gathered at the record shop Helvete ("Hell") in Oslo. In interviews, they voiced extreme anti-Christian and misanthropic views, presenting themselves as a cult-like group of militant Satanists who wanted to spread terror, hatred and evil. They adopted pseudonyms and appeared in photographs wearing "corpse paint" and wielding medieval weaponry. The scene was exclusive and created boundaries around itself, incorporating only those it deemed to be "trve" or committed. Musical integrity was highly important and artists wanted black metal to remain underground and uncorrupted.

References 

Lists of black metal bands